Thomas David Gordon (born 1954) (also known as T. David Gordon) is a professor, media ecologist, author, pastor, and Reformed Christian theologian.

Thomas David Gordon was born in Richmond, Virginia in 1954. Gordon received a B.L.A. from Roanoke College, a M.A.R. and Th.M. from Westminster Theological Seminary, and Ph. D. from Union Theological Seminary in Virginia where he wrote a dissertation entitled Paul's Understanding of the Law: A Tri-polar Analysis (1984).
 Gordon served as Professor of New Testament and Greek at Gordon-Conwell Theological Seminary in Massachusetts from 1984 to 1998, and professor of Greek and Religious Studies at Grove City College in Pennsylvania from 1999 to the present. He also served as Pastor in Christ Presbyterian Church, a Presbyterian Church in America congregation in Nashua, New Hampshire, from 1989 to 1998. He has published numerous peer reviewed articles and well-known books including, Why Johnny Can’t Preach: The Media Have Shaped the Messengers (2009) and Why Johnny Can’t Sing Hymns: How Pop Culture Re-Wrote the Hymnal (2010).

References

External links
T. David Gordon Personal site
Grove City College faculty page

Roanoke College alumni
American Calvinist and Reformed theologians
American male non-fiction writers
American biblical scholars
Westminster Theological Seminary alumni
Gordon–Conwell Theological Seminary faculty
Union Presbyterian Seminary alumni
Grove City College faculty
Living people
1954 births
People from Richmond, Virginia
Presbyterian Church in America ministers
20th-century Calvinist and Reformed theologians
21st-century Calvinist and Reformed theologians
Hermeneutists